Tetrazolylglycine (Tet-Gly, LY-285,265)  is a potent and selective NMDA receptor agonist, stimulating the NMDA receptor with higher potency than either glutamate or NMDA. It is a potent convulsant and excitotoxin and is used in scientific research.

References

Tetrazoles
Convulsants
Amino acid derivatives
Neurotoxins
Excitotoxins
Toxic amino acids
NMDA receptor agonists